Events from the year 1947 in Romania. The year saw the abdication of Michael I of Romania and foundation of the Romanian People's Republic.

Incumbents
King: Michael I (until 30 December).
General Secretary of the Romanian Communist Party: Gheorghe Gheorghiu-Dej (de facto head of state from 30 December).
Prime Minister: Petru Groza.

Events
 3 January – The Work and Reconstruction National Union party is founded by Constantin Argetoianu in Bucharest.
 6 January – The Ministry of National Economy decides the rationing of the consumption of petroleum products.
 10 January – The Military Court of Justice decides that the trial of the Iași pogrom should start in Bucharest, at the Martial Court of the 2 Army Corps.
 10 February – Romania signs the Paris Peace Treaties.
 3 April – The Assembly of Deputies unanimously votes in favour of the Navigation and Commerce Treaty between Romania and the USSR, that had been signed in Moscow on 20 February 1947.
 14 July –  Ion Mihalache and other leaders of the National Peasants' Party are arrested in the Tămădău affair.
 15 August – The , Great Stabilisation, replaces the old leu at a rate of 20,000 old lei = 1 new leu.
 23 August – The Assembly of Deputies unanimously votes in favour of the law ratifying the Paris Peace Treaties.
 15 September – The Paris Peace Treaties enter force.
 30 December – Michael I abdicates and Romania becomes the Romanian People's Republic.

Births
 1 January – , member of the administration council of the National Bank of Romania (BNR) since 2004.
 2 January – , Romanian historian, folklorist and writer (died 2017)
 7 January – Dan Anca, Romanian footballer (died 2005)
 12 January – Tatiana Moșteanu, economist.
 14 January – , essayist (died 2015).
 1 February – Rozalia Șooș, handball player.
 21 February – Romeo Chiriac, doctor (died 1995).
 27 May – Liana Moraru, composer and pianist (died 2011).
 7 July – Lidia Vianu, academic, writer, and translator.
 22 July – Mihaela Peneș, Olympic gold-medal winning javelin thrower.
 26 August – Nicolae Dobrin, Romanian footballer (died 2007).
 21 September – Ștefan Arteni, painter (died 2020).

Deaths

 28 January – Iuliu Moisil, honorary member of the Romanian Academy (b. 1859).
 14 April – Ioan Botez, literary historian (born 1872).
 23 April – Gheorghe Ciuhandu, priest and human rights advocate  (born 1875).
 5 August – Constantin Vernescu-Vâlcea, actor who played Ion Luca Caragiale play roles and was student of Matei Millo (born 1865).
 3 October – Traian Brăileanu, sociologist and politician, died at Aiud Prison  (born 1882).
 3 November – Alexandru C. Cuza, Romanian far right politician (born 1857).
 8 November – Constantin Sănătescu, 44th Prime Minister of Romania (born 1885).
 17 November – Emil Racoviță, biologist and Antarctic explorer (born 1868).
 11 December – Aleksandër Stavre Drenova, Albanian national poet (born 1872).

References